Abd al-Hamid ibn Yahya al-Katib was the secretary to the last Umayyad Caliph, Marwan II, and a supreme stylist of early Arabic prose.

Quote:
Cultivate the Arabic language so that you may speak correctly; develop a handsome script which will add luster to your writings; learn the poetry of the Arabs by heart; familiarize yourself with unusual ideas and expressions; read the history of the Arabs and the Persians, and remember their great deeds

He may have been a descendant of a Persian captive at the battle of Qadesiya who became a mawlā (freedman) of the Qorashī clan of the Banu Amer b. Loʾayy. Some accounts, however, make the less likely claim that he was of this clan, hence of pure Arab descent. According to the Encyclopedia of Islam (3rd edition), Abd al-Hamid al-Katib was "a third-generation Muslim of non-Arab, probably Persian, extraction".

References

Year of birth unknown
749 deaths
Medieval Arabic-language writers
8th-century people from the Umayyad Caliphate
Government of the Umayyad Caliphate
People of Iranian descent